The 2014 Valparaiso Crusaders football team represented Valparaiso University in the 2014 NCAA Division I FCS football season. They were led by first-year head coach Dave Cecchini and played their home games at Brown Field. They were a member of the Pioneer Football League. They finished the season 4–8, 2–6 in PFL play to finish in a tie for 9th place.

Schedule

Source: Schedule

References

Valparaiso
Valparaiso Beacons football seasons
Valparaiso Crusaders football